Ramtin soleimanzadeh is an Iranian footballer  who currently plays for Iranian football club Aluminium Arak F.C. in the Persian Gulf Pro League.

References

1988 births
Living people
Iranian footballers
Aluminium Arak players
Association football central defenders